Anna (Annie) Sadilek Pavelka is best known as the real life inspiration for the character Antonia Shimerda in Willa Cather's 1918 novel, My Ántonia.

Personal life 
Annie was born in Bohemia (now Czech Republic), though her date of birth is unknown for certain. She and her parents, František and Anna Sadílek, and siblings moved to north central Webster County, Nebraska in Nebraska in 1880. In Bohemia, František was a weaver and a musician, and Cather's novel dramatizes his transition from his former profession to farming. Following her father's death, Annie moved to Red Cloud, Nebraska to work with the Miner and Garber families. According to the Historical Essay in the Scholarly Edition of My Ántonia (University of Nebraska Press), Cather met Annie when she began working for Carrie and Irene Miner (the real life inspirations for Frances and Nina Harling in the novel). Cather said: "She [Annie] was one of the truest artists I ever knew in the keenness and sensitiveness of her enjoyment, in her love of people and in her willingness to take pains" (Bohlke 44). 
When Annie was a young woman, she - like Antonia in the novel - returned to Webster County, pregnant, after being left by a railroad employee, James William Murphy. Back in her hometown, she gave birth to her daughter in 1892. In 1896, she married John Pavelka (Cuzak in the novel), with whom she had twelve children, three of whom died in childhood. 
Cather and Annie reconnected in 1915, and they corresponded for years afterwards. In 1916, Cather made a trip to the Pavelka farm that may have been the inspiration for the final chapters of the novel, in which Jim Burden returns to Nebraska to visit Ántonia and her family. Annie Pavelka died in 1955, but her family members remain actively engaged in preserving her memory.

References

Further reading 
 Willa Cather's Biography
 The Story Behind the 1936 Annie Pavelka Letter

American people of Czech descent
People from Webster County, Nebraska
1955 deaths
People from Red Cloud, Nebraska